Organ Mountain High School (OMHS) is one of the four traditional public high schools in Las Cruces, New Mexico. As of 2012-2013, the school has over 1,500 students, and covers grades 9-12. The school is a part of the Las Cruces Public Schools district.

History
Organ Mountain had originally moved into Sierra Middle school in 1988 where Jeff Pomeroy served as the 1st Student Body President.  The construction of the current building was completed in 1993, and was Las Cruces' Third high school. The school was to be built with a planetarium and largest performing art center out of the three schools. The construction for the building begun in 1991. The school was built to look like a castle, from its brick to its layout, and has a royal theme. The match the theme, black and white were chosen as the schools colors, and the Knight became its mascot.

The original name of the school, Oñate High School, was chosen by a city vote while the school was under construction, and the color teal was added to the school by the cheerleaders in order give the school more color. In July 2021, the school was renamed to Organ Mountain High School.

Academics

School grade
The NMPED (New Mexico Public Education department) replaced the "No child left behind act" and AYP testing with a new school grading formula, which took effect for the 2010-11 school years. The grade is calculated using many forms of testing, and includes graduation rates.

Athletics
OMHS competes in the New Mexico Activities Association (NMAA), as a class 6A school in District 3. In 2014, NMAA realigned the state's schools in to six classifications and adjusted district boundaries.  In addition to Organ Mountain High School, the schools in District 3-6A include: Mayfield High School, Las Cruces High School, Gadsden High School and Deming High School.

On May 11, 2017 Former Midland Lee wide receivers coach and passing game coordinator Scott Veliz was named the new head football coach at Organ Mountain High School. Prior to his arrival in Midland last spring, Veliz spent several years coaching football in El Paso, Texas. He served as the offensive coordinator at El Paso Eastwood in 2013 & 2014, where he directed a Troopers offense that averaged just under 40 points per game. In 2015, he became the offensive coordinator at El Paso El Dorado and engineered an Aztecs attack that scored 46.8 points per contest. Those numbers were good enough to be ranked #2 in yards per game and #5 in points per game in the entire state of Texas.

References

1988 establishments in New Mexico
Educational institutions established in 1988
Buildings and structures in Las Cruces, New Mexico
Public high schools in New Mexico
Schools in Doña Ana County, New Mexico